South Antrim may refer to:

The southern part of County Antrim
South Antrim (Assembly constituency)
South Antrim (Northern Ireland Parliament constituency)
South Antrim (UK Parliament constituency)